Billionaire's Club is a Nigerian movie directed by Afam Okereke released in 1999. The movie involves a secret society of men who use occult powers to manipulate people and make blood money.

Cast 
 Pete Edochie
 Fabien Adibe
 Chidi Ihesie
 Kanayo O. Kanayo
 Clem Ohameze
 Patience Ozokwor
 Sola Sobowale
 Tony Umez 
 Bruno Iwuoha
 Nelson Nalumino

References

2003 films
Nigerian drama films
2000s English-language films
English-language Nigerian films